The Starbucks Reserve Roastery (or simply the Seattle Roastery) is a Starbucks location in Seattle, in the U.S. state of Washington. Located in the Capitol Hill neighborhood, the operation is part of the company's Starbucks Reserve program. The location has been described as Starbuck's "flagship Reserve Roastery", and workers at the site have unionized.

Description

Thrillist has called the roastery an "absolute playground for coffee lovers", offering "an immersive experience in how Starbucks sources, roasts, and crafts their beverages". According to the website, the location has a "library with more than 200 titles on coffee, fresh-baked Italian fare, local Fran's Chocolates and coffee pairings, as well as coffee-inspired cocktails. Here, you can also explore the entire roasting process, learn about different brew methods, and take a deep dive on the coffee's unique origin stories."

History
The roastery occupies a building originally constructed during the 1920s, in an area historically referred to as "Auto Row" because of the many car dealerships which have operated nearby. Starbucks opened the roastery in December 2014. Workers at the site filed for a union election in February 2022.

References

External links

 

2014 establishments in Washington (state)
Capitol Hill, Seattle
Coffee in Seattle
Restaurants in Seattle
Starbucks